Angadi Theru ( Market Street) is a 2010 Indian Tamil-language romantic drama film written and directed by Vasanthabalan, starring debutant Mahesh and Anjali. The title refers to the Ranganathan Street in Chennai where the story takes place. The film features music jointly composed by Vijay Antony and G. V. Prakash Kumar. An Ayngaran International production, the film was launched on 11 February 2008 and released on 26 March 2010 to critical acclaim. The film was shortlisted for the Indian submissions for the Academy Award for Best Foreign Language Film but lost to Peepli Live. It released in Telugu as Shopping Mall. The film was box-office success.

Plot
The film starts with Jyothi Lingam (Mahesh) and Kani (Anjali) playing and making fun of each other.  As they do not have any house, they find a place in the street where masonry workers are sleeping. While they were dreaming, a fire engine completely loses its control after colliding with another vehicle. It comes out of the way and hits the people sleeping in the street. Kani and Jyothi are badly injured and are rushed to the hospital.

The flashback starts and goes to a village in Tirunelveli. Jyothi is a bright student and son of a mason who leads a happy life in his village near Tirunelveli. One day tragedy strikes as his father, the only earning member, dies in an accident while crossing an unmanned railway gate, and the young boy now has to look after his mother and two sisters. Jyothi, along with hundreds of others, are employed at the Senthil Murugan Stores run by the big businessman Annachi (Pala. Karuppiah). In each floor at the textile showroom, there are around 50 to 60 salesmen and women who work in pitiable conditions from early in the morning to late at night, without any rest. Jyothi meets Kani, a fiery, independent girl. The difficult and harrowing times in the store bring them together as they face up to a cruel and lewd store supervisor Karungali (A. Venkatesh), who beats up men and molests women when they play around during duty hours. As Jyothi says there is no escape from the "jail-like" atmosphere in the shop where employees are treated more like slave labor in a concentration camp than without any human dignity. After some quarrels and arguments, these two survive in a concentration camp-like condition.
 
In the meantime, actress Sneha visits the showroom for the shooting of the advertisement. Marimuthu is a die-hard fan of Sneha. He has collected all her pictures from her childhood and keeps them with him. He was very interested to see her. Amidst the security, he caught Sneha's attention and meets her and shows her the album. Sneha is surprised and happy to see the album and tells Marimuthu that she will keep it herself. While Jyothi and Kani were talking in the showroom, Karungali comes there. On seeing this, they both hide. Unfortunately, the security guard locks the door of the showroom without knowing this. Kani shouts at Jyothi, and they do not know what to do. They have to spend the whole night there itself. After some time, they are putting the dresses in that room one by one, singing, and dancing. They spend the night like this, and the next morning, they change into their working attire and go to their places as if they came only in the morning. Unfortunately, the dance by the two gets caught in the camera running there for the shooting with Sneha. Annachi sees this and calls Karungali, who yells at both Jyothi and Kani. Jyothi, in an angry rage, beats up Karungali but is beaten up by him, the police, and other supervisors. Then, Karungali gives a complaint to the police that Jyothi had stolen a costly saree from the shop, and the police takes Jyothi away. Jyothi tells the inspector that he knows all the fraud activities done by Annachi. So the inspector calls Annachi and advises him to take back the complaint. Otherwise it will be difficult if Jyothi tells all these things to the media. So Jyothi is released from custody.
 
Jyothi goes to the showroom and threatens Karungali that if they did not release Kani, he will expose these things to the public there. On hearing this, Annachi orders Karungali to send Kani with Jyothi. They both leave the place and search for jobs in all the shops in that street. Finally, a blind old-aged person who is selling clothes on the platform tells Jyothi that he will give commission to them if they help him in selling clothes. So they start selling clothes and earn some money for the day. The old man tells them a street where they can safely sleep. They go to the street, and there ends the flashback.
 
The camera now points to the hospital, where Jyothi and Kani are admitted. Jyothi regains consciousness and sees Marimuthu there. Jyothi has slight injuries on his head, legs and hands. He asks Marimuthu about Kani, but Marimuthu remains silent. So Jyothi himself gets out from his bed irrespective of his injuries and searches to find Kani. He was shocked to see Kani without her legs as she had lost them in the accident. Marimuthu advises Jyothi to forget Kani as she cannot do things on her own and needs someone's help. Many things are running in Jyothi's mind, and he finally he decides to marry Kani.

Six months later, Marimuthu has become Sneha's makeup man, Kani is sitting on a platform selling things, and Jyothi is selling things by walking in the street.

Cast
 Mahesh as Jyothi Lingam
 Anjali as Kani
 A. Venkatesh as Pavunu alias Karungali
 Pandi as Marimuthu, Jyothi Lingam's friend
 John Vijay as Director
 Pala. Karuppiah as Annachi
 Imman Annachi as Store Worker
 Sneha as herself (Cameo appearance)

Soundtrack

The soundtrack album was composed by G. V. Prakash Kumar, while Vijay Antony composed two songs and also scored the background music . Lyrics were penned by Na. Muthukumar. Shreya Ghoshal won Filmfare Award for Best Female Playback Singer – Tamil for the song 'Un Perai Sollum Podhe'.

Reception

The film received positive reviews from critics and audiences. Behindwoods mentioned, "Angadi Theru is an eye opener to all those who are on the rosier side of life,it's an overdose of emotions, but you don't mind it: simply because the characters have handled the scenes so skilfully." Parvathi Srinivasan from Rediff described the film as a, "kind of cinema you keep hoping for and only rarely get," labeling it, "A must watch."
Many reviewers appreciated Anjali's performance with Behindwoods commenting that, "The girl looks every bit her role with an impressive gamut of emotions running through her face." Chennaionline.com gave credit to the theme of the film by stating that, "Vasanthabalan must be applauded for courageously presenting us a film that looks into the darker side of the glittery world of massive show rooms. The film was declared success at box office.

Awards
Angaadi Theru won the 2010 Best Film Award at the Chennai International Film Festival on 24 December 2010. It also won accolades in the following award ceremonies.

2010 Vikatan Awards
 Best Actress – Anjali
 Best Story – Vasanthabalan

Norway Tamil Film Festival
 Best Film – K. Karunamoorthy, C. Arunpandian
 Best Actress – Anjali

Vijay Awards
 Best Film – K. Karunamoorthy, C. Arunpandian
 Best Director – Vasanthabalan
 Best Actress – Anjali

Filmfare Awards South
 Best Director – Tamil – Vasanthabalan
 Best Actress – Tamil – Anjali
 Best Female Playback Singer – Tamil – Shreya Ghoshal

Tamil Nadu State Film Awards
Tamil Nadu State Film Award Special Prize for Best Film - K. Karunamoorthy and C. Arunpandian
 Tamil Nadu State Film Award Special Prize for Jury Award for Special Performance - Actress Anjali

References

Further reading
 Christopher, Michael & Helen Staufer (2011). "Urban. Village. Urban-Village. Angaditheru and its mofussil department store society in Chennai", in: manycinemas 1, 24-37

External links
 

2010 films
2010s Tamil-language films
Indian romantic drama films
Films scored by Vijay Antony
Films scored by G. V. Prakash Kumar
2010 romantic drama films
Films directed by Vasanthabalan